Cusack Park may refer to:

Cusack Park (Ennis), Ireland, home of Clare GAA
Cusack Park (Mullingar), Ireland, home of Westmeath GAA